The Duparc Rocks are a group of rocks between  off the coast,  northeast of Cape Roquemaurel, Trinity Peninsula. They were mapped from surveys by the Falkland Islands Dependencies Survey (1960–61), and were named by the UK Antarctic Place-Names Committee for Louis Duparc, a French naval officer on the Astrolabe during her Antarctic voyage (1837–1840).

References 

Rock formations of the Trinity Peninsula